Sanakoev is a surname. Notable people with the surname include:

 David Sanakoev (born 1976), South Ossetian politician
 Dmitri Sanakoev  (born 1969), South Ossetian and Georgian politician
 Grigory Sanakoev (1935–2021), Russian chess player

Surnames of Russian origin